Clarissa is a 1941 German romance film directed by Gerhard Lamprecht and starring Sybille Schmitz, Gustav Fröhlich and Gustav Diessl. Schmitz plays the domineering manager of a bank who eventually falls in love with one of the other employees.

It was shot at the Althoff Studios in Berlin and on location in Potsdam and the Baltic Sea.

Cast

References

External links

Films of Nazi Germany
German romance films
1940s romance films
German black-and-white films
Films directed by Gerhard Lamprecht
Films with screenplays by Thea von Harbou
Films shot at Althoff Studios
1940s German-language films
1940s German films